Francesco Caracciolo or Ammiraglio Caracciolo or simply Caracciolo was the name of at least two ships of the Italian Navy named in honour of Francesco Caracciolo and may refer to:

 , a sail corvette launched in 1811 for the Neapolitan Navy, originally as Amalia and later renamed Maria Carolina, and incorporated into the Regia Marina after the unification of Italy.
 , a screw corvette launched in 1869.
 , a  laid down in 1914 and launched in 1920. She was never completed.
 , a  launched in 1940 and sunk in 1941.

Italian Navy ship names